Mangkeng is a ceremony used by the Betawi people, who traditionally live in the coastal villages of Jakarta. The ceremony is used at important public gatherings and especially at weddings. The main purpose is to bring good luck and ward off the rain. It is performed by the village shaman, also called the Pangkeng shaman, where the name originates.

References

Ceremonies in Indonesia